Ocnogyna herrichi is a moth of the family Erebidae. It was described by Staudinger in 1879. It is found in Turkey.

References

Spilosomina
Moths described in 1879